Big Pharma (born Jussi Ylikoski) is a Helsinki-based electronic music producer. He is also known as the guitarist of Disco Ensemble which is one of the most internationally hyped Finnish bands in the 2000s. Big Pharma's first single "Freedom Juice" was released in May 2015. The debut album Freedom Juice was released on April 1, 2016. There are many guest appearances on the album, e.g. Ville Malja from Lapko.

Discography 
Singles
Freedom Juice (May 2015)
United By The Night feat. Ville Malja (September 2015)
Bloods Unite feat. Ringa Manner (November 2015)
Fucking Live It Up feat. Miikka Koivisto (December 2015)
Midnight Call (January 2016)
Suburban Trap (March 2016)

Albums
Freedom Juice (April 2016)

Videos
Freedom Juice
United By The Night feat. Ville Malja
Fucking Live It Up feat. Miikka Koivisto
Midnight Call
Suburban Trap

References 
Fullsteam Management
Fullsteam Management: Big Pharma
Sony Music: Big Pharma
MTV: Big Pharma
YleX: Big Pharma
Soundi: Big Pharma

External links 

Instagram

Finnish electronic musicians
Finnish guitarists
Living people
Year of birth missing (living people)